Derek Plumstead (birth registered second ¼ 1944) is an English former professional rugby league footballer who played in the 1960s.

Background
Derek Plumstead's birth was registered in Lower Agbrigg district, Wakefield, West Riding of Yorkshire, England, and he was a pupil at Hall Green School, Wakefield.

Playing career

County Cup Final appearances
Derek Plumstead played right-, i.e. number 12, in Wakefield Trinity's 18-2 victory over Leeds in the 1964 Yorkshire County Cup Final during the 1964–65 season at Fartown Ground, Huddersfield on Saturday 31 October 1964.

References

External links
Search for "Plumstead" at rugbyleagueproject.org

1944 births
Living people
English rugby league players
Rugby league players from Wakefield
Rugby league second-rows
Wakefield Trinity players